"War Games" is the seventeenth episode of the first series of Space: 1999.  The screenplay was written by Christopher Penfold; the director was Charles Crichton.  The final shooting script is dated 15 October 1974.  Live-action filming took place Thursday 24 October 1974 through Thursday 7 November 1974.

Story 

The Moon is travelling through a binary star system, where sensors detect a habitable planet supporting an advanced civilisation.  For days, introductory hails go unanswered.  As the mood on Alpha grows apprehensive, tracking radar picks up three objects speeding toward the Moon without advance warning from long-range scan.  The staff is stunned when the craft are seen to be Mark IX Hawks—space fighter-ships developed on Earth.  With recognisable war machines approaching from an unresponsive planet, John Koenig deploys Combat Flight One.  Led by Alan Carter, three armed Eagles lift off to intercept.

Moonbase Alpha mobilises for battle:  Combat Flight Two is put on stand-by, defence screens are activated, and rescue and emergency medical units prepare for action.  In space, the Hawk squadron easily evades the defending Eagles.  Flight One gives chase, but the Hawks' top velocity is twice that of the Eagles.  Koenig is reluctant to fire pre-emptively, hoping his fear of an attack proves to be wrong.  The interlopers continue to close on Alpha; just before they can move out of the Eagles' weapons range, he gives the order to fire.  The Hawk squadron is destroyed.

After Carter expresses concern that his victory was too easy, a second Hawk squadron is detected approaching from the opposite direction.  Koenig orders Flight Two into action.  Eagle Four has barely cleared Alpha when it is struck; debris from the explosion smashes into the Main Mission building, bringing the ceiling down on the staff.  Eagle Five is two metres off the deck when struck.  Eagle Six is still rising on its lift as a Hawk destroys the launch pad.  An adjacent building is hit and the occupants of its breached compartments are swept out into space.

The Hawk squadron regroups, giving Eagles One, Two and Three time to intercept.  The dogfight is short and brutal.  Carter is the only member of Flight One to escape destruction.  His ship damaged by flying debris, he powers down and plays dead.  The surviving Hawk descends on Moonbase.  Emergency bulkhead doors seal off all sections as non-essential personnel are sent to the underground shelters.  Koenig and a skeleton crew hold out in Main Mission while the attack rages.  Alpha is devastated as the Hawk makes multiple strafing runs across the defenceless base.

Shrapnel punctures a window in the Medical Section's overwhelmed casualty reception ward.  Helena Russell orders the room cleared as Bob Mathias tries to seal the dangerous leak.  Koenig and the men rush to assist.  When the Medical building is attacked, the overstressed window shatters.  As the room violently decompresses, Koenig yanks Helena to safety through the closing door.  An unlucky Mathias and one bed-ridden patient are swept outside to perish on the lunar surface.

With Alpha in ruins, the Hawk withdraws.  Koenig, worried about the aliens' next move, returns to Main Mission.  Sandra Benes has his answer on the big screen:  a massive (and oddly familiar) space battleship is approaching, accompanied by a flotilla of Hawks.  Having knocked out Alpha's fighter defences, the aliens are now sending in the bombers.  The alien task force passes the drifting hulk of Eagle One.  Carter knows he is the only one who can prevent the coming massacre; he and co-pilot Pete Johnson power up and fire a concentrated laser charge at the dreadnought.  The ship and its fighter screen vanish in a massive fireball.  Mission accomplished, Carter returns to base.

Standing in his wrecked command post, Koenig has little optimism of restoring the base to operational status.  At a command conference, the senior staff passes final judgment on Alpha.  All vital systems—food production and recycling facilities, water purification plant, main generators—are heavily damaged and will require weeks to repair...but only eight days of battery power remain.  Fatalities number 128 dead or missing—many blown out into space by explosive decompression and most from the Technical and Maintenance departments.  With the next solar system six months distant, Koenig reckons their only hope is to seek asylum on the planet.

The surviving Alpha population makes preparations to evacuate.  With Paul Morrow broadcasting their peaceful intent, Koenig and Helena fly down in an unarmed reconnaissance Eagle to attempt to open a dialogue with their aggressors.  Approaching the surface, Helena marvels at the verdant landscape and advanced cities.  Koenig notes the ship is veering off course; manual corrections make no difference and contact with Alpha is severed.  A voice tells them they are under ground control and to prepare for touchdown.

They are conveyed to an advanced, decidedly surreal control centre.  Helena muses if the surrounding lights and colours could be the alien language, but Koenig reminds her of the voice contact.  A humanoid male with an enlarged cranium materialises inside a transparent column.  Both face and voice are emotionless as he tells the Earthmen to state their case.  Koenig accuses the alien of ignoring their peaceful hails, launching an unprovoked attack, and leaving them without the means to live.

The alien's response is simple:  they have no place in space.  Humankind is nothing more than a contaminating organism, a plague of fear.  A female alien appears, stating their presence on this world would destroy a billions-year-old civilisation.  Koenig refuses to accept their verdict of extinction.  He tells them how, against insurmountable odds, they have survived the rigours of space since leaving Earth orbit.  Whether by the strength of the human spirit or the grace of a higher power, they will endure.  Unmoved by his proclamation, the aliens go silent.

Desperate, Koenig employs a different method of persuasion:  he begins to vandalise the fragile artefacts around him.  The two aliens are suddenly standing outside their columns, wielding heavy-duty Earth-style laser rifles.  Koenig is caught in a cross-fire and falls to the floor, dead.  A weeping Helena cradles his burned body.  The aliens move toward her and she draws her stun-gun; the female informs her that any force she uses will be turned against herself.

One instant, she is backed into a corner; the next, she is clad in the same robes as the aliens and seated in one of their column-habitats...completely at peace.  As if reading her thoughts, the male informs Helena this world has evolved beyond fear.  Regarding Koenig, the female states it was fear that killed him.  She offers Helena the opportunity to share their power and bring substance to her desire that he live.  The doctor concentrates, and Koenig stands alive and unmarked.  He moves to free her, but is repelled by an energy field.

Helpless, Koenig returns to the Eagle and takes off.  Contacting Alpha, he tells Bergman they can live on this planet—but will have to fight for a foothold.  He orders the last laser-equipped Eagle launched to rendezvous with him in space.  Upon docking, Koenig changes places with the co-pilot.  Johnson flies the reconnaissance Eagle back to the Moon while Koenig and Carter set course for the planet.  During this, the evacuation is completed.  Bergman is among the last to leave.  He records a poignant message for any future travellers that might land on the wandering Moon, giving a brief history of their voyage and their uncertain fate.  He departs, bidding Alpha a heartfelt farewell.

On the planet, Helena tries to decipher her captors' abstractions.  Though confined in the column, they insist she is not a prisoner...free to go where her mind can lead her.  Impassive as ever, they inform her of Koenig's bid to rescue her and win living space on this planet.  When she asks if he will succeed, the male's enigmatic reply is that Koenig is very much afraid of their stopping him.  Approaching the planet, the Eagle encounters an energy barrier.  Koenig forges on, but the Eagle cannot withstand the powerful force-field.  The two men eject as the ship breaks up.  Floating in space, Koenig calls out to Carter—but the astronaut is dead, his space-helmet visor shattered in the explosion.

The aliens begin indoctrinating Helena to their world.  The complex around her is a macro-brain, developing and growing with each generation of attendants who reside within and fed by the life-force of the collective population.  When Helena comments that it is the brain they are protecting with their warships, the female corrects her—they have no fear, thus no need of fighting machines.  Helena protests; the ships that destroyed Alpha must have originated here.  The male only replies that Mankind is full of fear.

The aliens bring Helena into communion with the brain, showing her their world of balance and harmony, regulated and perfected by the brain...a world without fear.  With this heightened awareness, she  senses Koenig's dilemma—adrift in space with a dwindling oxygen supply.  Her love for him abolishes the aliens' influence; using their power, she intends to rescue him.  The aliens protest; Koenig has accepted death, thus conquering fear.  In bringing him back, his fear would also return—fear which will destroy them all.  'We are what we are,' she affirms, and Koenig plummets toward the planet.

Materialising in the brain centre, he fires on the alien male.  His one shot sets off a chain reaction that destroys the entire complex.  Searching the rubble, he finds Helena.  As they exchange a loving glance, the destruction continues until the entire planet is laid waste.  Now faced with certain defeat, Koenig contacts the approaching Eagles and tells them to turn back.  As they are going to die, they should die on Alpha...

...where Koenig and staff watch the approaching Hawks from an undamaged Main Mission.  They are at the moment before Koenig gave the order to fire.  When events seem doomed to follow the same cycle of destruction, Helena enters and she and Koenig lock eyes.  Struck by a sudden flash of insight, he commands Carter to stand down...after which the Hawks literally vanish from existence.  When Bergman wonders if this is a sign they will be permitted to land on the planet, the aliens reply with a resounding negative.

The entire sequence of events has been an illusion, played out in an instant of time to show them the consequences of contact with this civilisation.  As demonstrated, humanity's mere presence would destroy this perfect world.  To keep them away, the aliens' only defence was to make the Alphans' worst fears appear real—the Hawks, the dreadnought, the planetary force-barrier.  As each diversionary measure failed, another was created from the fear dominating their minds.  The aliens hope they will voluntarily choose to stay away.

Feeling like chastised children, the staff looks to Koenig and Helena as they try to make sense of the experience.  Helena can only recall the lingering memory, both strange and beautiful, of a world without fear...

Cast

Starring 
 Martin Landau — Commander John Koenig
 Barbara Bain — Doctor Helena Russell

Also Starring 
 Barry Morse — Professor Victor Bergman

Guest Artist 
 Isla Blair — Female Alien

Guest Star 
 Anthony Valentine — Male Alien

Featuring 
 Prentis Hancock — Controller Paul Morrow
 Clifton Jones — David Kano
 Zienia Merton — Sandra Benes
 Anton Phillips — Doctor Bob Mathias
 Nick Tate — Captain Alan Carter

Uncredited Artists 
 Suzanne Roquette — Tanya
 James Fagan — Astronaut Pete Johnson
 Sarah Bullen — Kate
 Robert Atiko — Alphan Operative
 Paul Weston — Alphan Man One (Explosive Decompression Victim)
 Colin Skeaping — Alphan Man Two (Explosive Decompression Victim)

Music 

In addition to the regular Barry Gray score (drawn primarily from "Breakaway" and "Another Time, Another Place"), Mike Hankinson's composition 'The Astronauts' is used during the dogfight sequence as well as the Alpha attack scenes.

Production Notes 

 Originally proposed in George Bellak's list of potential stories, "War Games" was penned by story consultant Christopher Penfold.  Along with "Black Sun" and "Collision Course", it is considered to be one of the programme's most successful installments by actors, production staff and fans alike, exemplifying Space: 1999s metaphysical approach to science fiction.  ITC's New York executives initially rejected the script as it seemed to them to kill off members of the regular cast; it was finally approved for production after Penfold explained the ending.  At this point, frustrated at the direction he felt ITC's creative decisions were taking the show, Penfold began to consider leaving the series.
 The episode incorporated several themes Penfold frequently visited in his work.  He felt mankind could be seen as an invading virus, spreading destruction in space akin to the Spanish conquistadores devastation of the New World.  It also included anti-war sentiments, his distrust of nuclear technology and the concept of the macro-brain—seen later in "Space Brain".  Barry Morse felt it showcased George Bernard Shaw's belief that mankind's worst destructiveness comes either through anger or from fear, which usually prove to be without foundation.
 Actress Zienia Merton affirms this episode furthered her belief that director Charles Crichton owned significant shares in the company which produced Fuller's earth, the dust-like substance used in films to simulate explosions, create sand- or dust-storms, or age props or costumes.  After the dust-storms in the Crichton-helmed "Matter of Life and Death" and "The Last Sunset", the product was mixed with falling debris during the attack on Alpha.  Trays were suspended above the Main Mission and Medical Centre sets and tipped onto the cast.  Merton avoided the mess by diving under her desk; others, including Martin Landau and Prentis Hancock, were not as fortunate.
 The alien battleship seen here, designed by Martin Bower, made its debut in the episode "Alpha Child"; it would later appear in "Dragon's Domain" and "The Metamorph".  The brain-complex instrumentation was originally constructed for the Kaldorian ship in "Earthbound".  The aliens' transparent column-habitats would be re-vamped into growing compartments for "The Troubled Spirit" and other episodes set in Alpha's Hydroponics department.
 The Hawk spacecraft, also designed by Bower, made its first and only appearance in this story.  In response to concerns that it would appear too similar to the Eagles when filmed, Bray Studios technician Cyril Foster hurriedly painted orange details on the miniatures before the shoot.  The model was used in a number of visual-effects publicity stills, including some where it can be seen attacking the Bethan gunship from "The Last Enemy".

Novelisation 

The episode was adapted in the fifth Year One Space: 1999 novel Lunar Attack by John Rankine, published in 1975.

References

External links 
Space: 1999 - "War Games" - The Catacombs episode guide
Space: 1999 - "War Games" - Moonbase Alpha's Space: 1999 page

1975 British television episodes
Space: 1999 episodes